Ripley Township is one of twelve townships in Rush County, Indiana. As of the 2010 census, its population was 2,156 and it contained 908 housing units.

History
The County Line Bridge, Maurice W. Manche Farmstead, and Walnut Ridge Friends Meetinghouse are listed on the National Register of Historic Places.

Geography

Cities and towns
 Carthage

Unincorporated towns
 Boyd at 
 Charlottesville at 
 Farmers at 
 Henry at 
(This list is based on USGS data and may include former settlements.)

References

External links
 Indiana Township Association
 United Township Association of Indiana

Townships in Rush County, Indiana
Townships in Indiana